The West Indies cricket team toured New Zealand from 3 December 2013 to 15 January 2014, playing 3 Tests, 5 One Day Internationals and 2 Twenty20 Internationals against New Zealand. New Zealand won the three match test series 2-0 and the T20Is 2-0. The ODI series was drawn 2-2.

Squads
Test Squads

Aaron Redmond
BJ Watling (wk)
Brendon McCullum (c)
Corey Anderson
Doug Bracewell
Hamish Rutherford
Ish Sodhi
Kane Williamson
Neil Wagner
Peter Fulton
Ross Taylor
Tim Southee
Trent Boult
|

Daren Sammy (c)
Denesh Ramdin  (wk)
Tino Best
Kraigg Brathwaite
Darren Bravo
Shivnarine Chanderpaul
Sheldon Cottrell
Narsingh Deonarine
Kirk Edwards
Shannon Gabriel
Sunil Narine
Veerasammy Permaul
Kieran Powell
Shane Shillingford
Chadwick Walton
Chris Gayle

 ODI Squads

Test series

1st Test

2nd Test

3rd Test

ODI series

1st ODI

2nd ODI

3rd ODI

4th ODI

5th ODI

T20I Series

1st T20I

2nd T20I

Statistics

New Zealand
Brendon McCullum made his 7th Test century in the 1st innings of the 1st Test.
Ross Taylor made his 9th Test century and his 1st Test double-century in the 1st innings of the 1st Test. He made his highest Test score of 217*, this was also the highest number of runs for a New Zealand player at Dunedin.
Ross Taylor made his 10th Test century in the 1st innings of the 2nd Test.
Ross Taylor passed 4,000 Test runs in the 1st innings of the 2nd Test.
Ross Taylor made his 11th Test century in the 1st innings of the 3rd Test.
Tim Southee got his 100th Test wicket when he got Veerasammy Permaul out in the 2nd innings of the 3rd Test.
Corey Anderson made fastest ever One Day International century in 3rd ODI.

West Indies
Tino Best claimed his 50th Test wicket when he got Aaron Redmond out in the 1st innings of the 1st Test.
Shivnarine Chanderpaul passed 11,000 Test runs in the 1st innings of the 1st Test.
Darren Bravo made his 5th Test century in the 2nd innings of the 1st Test.
Darren Bravo passed 2,000 Test runs in the 2nd innings of the 1st Test.
Kieran Powell passed 1,000 Test runs in the 2nd innings of the 2nd Test.
Denesh Ramdin made his 5th Test century in the 1st innings of the 3rd Test.
Shivnarine Chanderpaul made his 29th Test century in the 1st innings of the 3rd Test.

References

External links
West Indies in New Zealand 2013-14 at ESPNcricinfo
Series page on Wisden India

2013 in New Zealand cricket
2013 in West Indian cricket
2013–14 New Zealand cricket season
2014 in New Zealand cricket
2014 in West Indian cricket
International cricket competitions in 2013–14
2013